Roberto Fiore (born 15 April 1959) is an Italian politician and the leader of the party Forza Nuova, convicted in Italy for subversion and armed gang activity and for his links to the right wing terrorist organization "Terza posizione" (Third position). He self-identifies as a neo-fascist.

In the United Kingdom
After the police found a large quantity of explosives and weapons in a local office of the political organization Terza Posizione in the 1980s, Roberto Fiore  migrated to the United Kingdom in order to avoid arrest. The anti-fascist magazine Searchlight claimed that Fiore was working for the Secret Intelligence Service. The allegation that he worked for MI6 was also made in para 2.12.11 of the Report drawn up on behalf of the European Parliament's Committee of Inquiry into Racism and Xenophobia, 1991 (The Ford Report).

Political activism
Fiore is generally considered to be a neofascist leader. In England Fiore became a close friend of Nick Griffin, sharing a flat with him. As of 2008, Fiore was running a language school called CL English Language.

Fiore has since returned to Italy, after his conviction became non-punishable for the statute of limitations, and is active in politics as the leader of the nationalist Forza Nuova party (a group he co-founded with Morsello), one of the constituent parts of Alternativa Sociale, allied in the House of Freedoms for the 2006 political elections in Italy. The party Forza Nuova has been defined as "nazi-fascist formation" by two verdicts of Court of Cassation.

In 2008 he joined as a speaker on the identitarian Nordic Festival (Nordiska Festivalen) in Sweden where he spoke about European identity. He participated in Budapest on 23 October 2008 to the commemorations of the Hungarian Insurrection against control by the Soviet Union in 1956, at the invitation of the Hungarian far-right movement HVIM. He also took up the seat in the European Parliament vacated by Alessandra Mussolini. In 2009 he gave a speech at the British National Party's annual Red White & Blue Festival.

In March 2011 he led demonstrations of Forza Nuova against the recent surge of immigrants to the island of Lampedusa, stating that: "Local people are now asking us to help secure the beaches, and if the Government continues to fail in its duty to protect the people, and also the territorial integrity of Italy and Europe, we will take up that challenge".

In February 2020 Fiore lost his court case for diffamation against the newspaper L'Espresso.

On 10 October 2021 he was arrested after assaulting the CGIL offices in Rome.

References

External links
Far-Right Festival in Greece Will Proceed as Planned, Party Says from The New York Times
Profile at European Parliament

1959 births
Living people
Politicians from Rome
Italian neo-fascists
MEPs for Italy 2004–2009
21st-century Italian politicians
Social Alternative MEPs
Third Position